Hande Baladın (born 1 September 1997) is a Turkish volleyball player. She started playing volleyball as middle blocker in the youth and junior teams of Eczacıbaşı Dynavit in Istanbul. Since 2014, she plays as opposite spiker. Baladın is a member of the women's national volleyball team, and wears number 7.

Career

Club
For the 2014-15 season, she was loaned out to Sarıyer Belediyespor along with four other players from the youth team of Eczacıbaşı Vitra. With Eczacıbaşı Vitra, she won the gold medal at the 2016 FIVB Volleyball Women's Club World Championship.

International
In July 2011, she was admitted to the Turkey girls' youth national team. She played in the national team at the 2011 Balkan Championships held in Tirana, Albania on July 12–18, at which they ranked fourth.

Baladın won the bronze medal with national team at the 2013 Girls' Youth European Volleyball Championship held in Serbia and Montenegro from March 30 to April 7, 2013. She was selected "Best Blocker" of the championship.

Awards

Club 
 2016 Club World Championship - Champion, with Eczacibasi Vitra
 2016-17 CEV champion League -  Bronze Medal, with Eczacibasi Vitra
 2017-18 CEV Cup -  Champion, with Eczacibasi Vitra
 2017-18 Turkish Cup -  Runner-Up, with Eczacibasi Vitra
 2017-18 Turkish League -  Runner-Up, with Eczacibasi
 2019 Spor Toto Champion's Cup (Turkish Super Cup) -  Champion, with Eczacibasi Vitra
 2019 Club world Championship -  Runner-Up, with Eczacibasi Vitra
 2020 AXA Sigorta Champions Cup (Turkish Super Cup) -  Champion, with Eczacibasi Vitra
 2021-22 CEV Cup -  Champion, with Eczacibasi Dynavit

Individual
 2013 Girls' Youth European Volleyball Championship - Best Blocker
 2017 U23 World Championship - Best Outside Spiker
 2017 U23 World Championship - Most Valuable Player

National team
 2013 Girls' Youth European Volleyball Championship - 
 2015 FIVB Volleyball Women's U23 World Championship - 
 2017 European Championship -  Bronze Medal
 2018 Nations League  -   Silver Medal
 2019 European Championship -  Silver Medal
 2021 Nations League -   Bronze Medal
 2021 European Championship -  Bronze Medal

See also
Turkish women in sports

References

External links
Player profile at Volleybox.net

1997 births
People from Kütahya
Living people
Turkish women's volleyball players
Eczacıbaşı volleyball players
Sarıyer Belediyesi volleyballers
Turkey women's international volleyball players
Galatasaray S.K. (women's volleyball) players
Volleyball players at the 2020 Summer Olympics
Olympic volleyball players of Turkey
20th-century Turkish sportswomen
21st-century Turkish sportswomen